Simona Gogîrlă (born as Tutuianu; 11 April 1975) is a retired Romanian handball player. She received a silver medal in the 2005 World Championship. She is the current coach of SCM Craiova.

Club's Performances

 CS Oltchim Rm. Valcea (1993-1997)
1993-1994

Romania National League

Romanian CUP

1994-1995

Romania National League

Romanian CUP

1995-1996

Romania National League

Romanian CUP

1996-1997

Romania National League

Romanian CUP

  RK Krim Ljubljana (1997-2001)

1997-1998

Slovenia National League

Slovenia Cup

1997-1998 FINAL EHF Champions League
1998-1999

Slovenia National League

Slovenian Cup

1999-2000

Slovenia National League

Slovenian Cup

2000-2001

Slovenia National League

Slovenian Cup

 CS Oltchim Rm. Valcea (2001-2003)
2001-2002 FINAL Cup Winner's Cup

 SD Itxako Estella(2003/04)
Play in EHF Cup and score 44 goals .

 Györi Audi ETÖ (2004-2007)
2004-2005

Hungarian National League

Magyar Cup

2004-2005 FINAL EHF Cup

2005-2006

Hungarian National League

Magyar Cup

Play EHF Champions League 2005-2006 and score 11 goals
Play EHF Champions League 2006-2007 and score 23 goals

 Rulmentul-Urban Brasov (2007-2010)
Play CUP WINNERS' CUP 2007/08 and score 47 goals
Play EHF CUP 2008/09 and score 20 goals
Play EHF CUP 2009/10 and score 13 goals

 Rapid Bucuresti (2010-2011) 
Play on National League I

Awards
2000 Top Scorer European Championship 2000 Romania

References

1975 births
Living people
Romanian female handball players
Sportspeople from Focșani
Expatriate handball players
Romanian expatriate sportspeople in Hungary
Romanian expatriate sportspeople in Slovenia
Győri Audi ETO KC players
Romanian expatriate sportspeople in Spain